Ell Township is one of sixteen townships in Hancock County, Iowa, USA.  As of the 2000 census, its population was 870.

History
Ell Township was organized in 1879. It was named for Sebastian Ell, a pioneer settler.

Geography
According to the United States Census Bureau, Ell Township covers an area of 36.39 square miles (94.25 square kilometers).

Cities, towns, villages
 Garner (south edge)
 Klemme

Adjacent townships
 Concord Township (north)
 Clear Lake Township, Cerro Gordo County (northeast)
 Union Township, Cerro Gordo County (east)
 Grimes Township, Cerro Gordo County (southeast)
 Avery Township (south)
 Twin Lake Township (southwest)
 Liberty Township (west)
 Garfield Township (northwest)

Cemeteries
The township contains Calvary Cemetery.

School districts
 Belmond-Klemme Community School District
 Garner-Hayfield Community School District
 Ventura Community School District

Political districts
 Iowa's 4th congressional district
 State House District 11
 State House District 12
 State Senate District 6

References

External links
 US-Counties.com
 City-Data.com
 United States Census Bureau 2008 TIGER/Line Shapefiles
 United States Board on Geographic Names (GNIS)
 United States National Atlas

Townships in Hancock County, Iowa
Townships in Iowa